Sadreh-ye Soveylat (also Romanized as Şadreh-ye Soveylāt; also known as Sedrah and Sedreh) is a village in Abdoliyeh-ye Gharbi Rural District, in the Central District of Ramshir County, Khuzestan Province, Iran. At the 2006 census, its population was 392, in 64 families.

References 

Populated places in Ramshir County